The 19th Vanier Cup was played on November 19, 1983, at Varsity Stadium in Toronto, Ontario, and decided the CIAU football champion for the 1983 season. The Calgary Dinos won their first ever championship by defeating the Queen's Golden Gaels by a score of 31-21.

References

External links
 Official website

Vanier Cup
Vanier Cup
Vanier Cup
Vanier Cup